The Comunidade Intermunicipal do Alto Tâmega is an administrative division in northern Portugal. It was created in 2014. Since January 2015, Alto Tâmega is also a NUTS3 subregion of Norte Region, that covers the same area as the intermunicipal community. The seat of the intermunicipal community is Chaves. Alto Tâmega comprises the northern part of the Vila Real District. The population in 2011 was 94,143, in an area of 2,921.91 km².

Municipalities

The intermunicipal community of Alto Tâmega consists of 6 municipalities:

References

External links
Official website CIM Alto Tâmega

Intermunicipal communities of Portugal
Norte Region, Portugal